Mobayi-Mbongo is a rural area of the province of Nord-Ubangi in the Democratic Republic of Congo (French: République démocratique du Congo).

The administrative jurisdiction was named Banzyville  until 1972. It faces Mobaye in the Central African Republic.

Subdivisions 
The territory consists of the commune (municipality) of  Mobayi-Mbongo, and two secteurs (sectors or neighbourhoods).

Demographics 

Territories of Nord-Ubangi Province